Nicola Hadwa Shahwan (born 1950) is a Palestine–Chilean commercial engineer and football manager. He was the first professional coach of Palestine national football team.

A man of leftist sympathies, he has been panelist of international media critical to US imperialism like TeleSur (Venezuelan channel controlled by Chavismo), HispanTV (Iranian critical channel of Occident) or Sputnik (Russian critical channel to US foreign affairs). He also has participed in scholar conferences sponsored by institutions like University of Valparaíso, where he analyzed geopolitical influences of United States towards Arab-israeli conflict (from the 19th century to the early 21st century) as well as how emergent economies (specially China) have countered US weight around the world.

Football career
In 2002, he was hired by Palestine Football Association to coach Palestine. According him, the reasons why that country's Football Association contacted him was because he was the first one professional coach in the history of Palestinian football.

In 2004, he renounced to Club Deportivo Palestino.

On 3 December 2020, Hadwa joined Concón National.

Political career
In 2017, he started a campaign to reach a seat in the Chamber of Deputies of Chile, being supported by Progressive Party then led by Marco Enríquez Ominami. He also received support from people of Chilean football world like the coach Jorge Garcés.

References

External links
 Hadwa's Profile at "Antiimperailist Front"

1950 births
Living people
People from Beit Jala
Palestinian football managers
Naturalized citizens of Chile
Chilean football managers
Chilean people of Palestinian descent
Deportes La Serena managers
Palestine national football team managers
Club Deportivo Palestino managers
Unión La Calera managers
Concón National managers
Primera B de Chile managers
Chilean Primera División managers
Chilean expatriate football managers
Expatriate football managers in the State of Palestine